Nandinadesvarar Temple is a Siva temple in Poikainallur in Nagapattinam district in Tamil Nadu (India).

Vaippu Sthalam
It is one of the shrines of the Vaippu Sthalams sung by Tamil Saivite Nayanar Appar.

Presiding deity
The presiding deity is Nandinadesvarar. The Goddess is known as Soundaranayaki.

Speciality
This place consists of North Poikainallur and South Poikainallur. North Poikainallur is the Vaippu Sthalam.

References

Hindu temples in Nagapattinam district
Shiva temples in Nagapattinam district